Kharu (also Romanized as Kharū) is a village in Barrud Rural District, Kuhsorkh County, Razavi Khorasan Province, Iran. At the 2006 census, its population was 89, in 30 families.

References 

Populated places in Kuhsorkh County